Augustus Lowell (January 15, 1830 – June 22, 1900) was a wealthy Massachusetts industrialist, philanthropist, horticulturist, and civic leader.  A member of the Brahmin Lowell family, he was born in Boston to John Amory Lowell and his second wife Elizabeth Cabot Putnam.  His great-grandfather, John Lowell, was among the first Judges for the newly created federal courts, appointed by Presidents George Washington and John Adams. Augustus' elder brother, Judge John Lowell, would be appointed to hold the same seats held by their great-grandfather, by Presidents Abraham Lincoln and Rutherford Hayes.

Family

Lowell was amongst the fifth generation in his family to graduate from Harvard College, class of 1850. On June 1, 1854, he married Katherine Bigelow Lawrence (February 21, 1832 - April 1, 1895), the daughter of Hon. Abbott Lawrence. Both Augustus and Katherine were able to trace their ancestry back through the earliest colonial settlers and founders of New England, in the mid-17th century, and even further back to notable English families of the 12th and 13th centuries.

Augustus and Katherine Lowell had seven children and thus named their , Brookline, Massachusetts, estate, Sevenels.  The Lowells lost two of their children during infancy but their surviving children went on to great public prominence. Eldest son Percival Lowell wrote several books on the Far East and on the planet Mars, and founded the Lowell Observatory in Flagstaff, Arizona.  Their second son, Abbott Lawrence Lowell, succeeded Augustus as Trustee at the Lowell Institute in 1900, and became President of Harvard College in 1909, serving in that capacity until 1933.  One of their daughters, Katharine Lowell, married (1) James Alfred Roosevelt, of the Long Island clan, and (2) T. James Bowlker, a Boston cotton mill owner. Another daughter, Elizabeth Lowell Putnam, was a prominent activist for prenatal care. And their youngest daughter, Amy Lowell, 20 years younger than her brothers, would become the second celebrated poet in the Lowell family.

Career 

Augustus was Treasurer of the Merrimack Manufacturing Company, a textile mill in Lowell, Massachusetts, for much of his early career.  In 1875, he became Treasurer of the Boott Cotton Mills, also in Lowell.  And in 1883, he was Director of The Winnipiseogee Lake Cotton and Woolen Manufacturing Company.  All were positions his father, John Amory, had once held within the same companies.  He was also, as of  1878, a director of the Pacific Mills in Lawrence, Massachusetts, the largest textile combine of its time.

Lowell was also a member of the Corporation of the Massachusetts Institute of Technology and Vice President of the American Academy of Arts and Sciences.  In 1881, Augustus was appointed as the sole Trustee of the Lowell Institute, upon his father's death (Lowell 1899, pp 118–119), a position he would hold for the last 20 years of his life.

See also 
 Lowell family
 First Families of Boston
 Lowell Institute
 Lowell, Massachusetts

References

External links

 

1830 births
1900 deaths
Philanthropists from Massachusetts
Harvard College alumni
Businesspeople from Boston
American people of English descent
Burials at Mount Auburn Cemetery
19th-century American philanthropists
19th-century American businesspeople